Donnie Ray Tuck (born August 16, 1954) is an American politician who is currently serving as mayor of Hampton, Virginia. Tuck made his first bid for elected office in 2003, to succeed Mary Christian in the Virginia House of Delegates; he lost the Democratic primary to Jeion Ward. He defeated incumbent mayor George E. Wallace in 2016. In 2020, Tuck won reelection over Chris Carter and Richelle D. Wallace.

Electoral history

2016

2020

See also
List of mayors of Hampton, Virginia

References

Mayors of Hampton, Virginia
Virginia Democrats
Living people
1954 births
Duke University alumni
Old Dominion University alumni
African-American mayors in Virginia